United Nations Security Council resolution 1414, adopted without a vote on 23 May 2002, after examining the application of the Democratic Republic of East Timor (Timor-Leste) for membership in the United Nations, the Council recommended to the General Assembly that East Timor be admitted.

The General Assembly later admitted East Timor to the United Nations on 27 September 2002 under Resolution 57/3.

See also
 Enlargement of the United Nations
 Member states of the United Nations
 List of United Nations Security Council Resolutions 1401 to 1500 (2002–2003)

References

External links
 
Text of the Resolution at undocs.org

 1414
 1414
 1414
2002 in East Timor
May 2002 events